Osteitis is inflammation of bone. More specifically, it can refer to one of the following conditions:
 Osteomyelitis, or infectious osteitis, mainly bacterial osteitis
 Alveolar osteitis or "dry socket"
 Condensing osteitis (or Osteitis condensans)
 Osteitis deformans (or Paget's disease of bone)
 Osteitis fibrosa cystica (or Osteitis fibrosa, or Von Recklinghausen's disease of bone)
 Osteitis pubis
 Radiation osteitis
 Osteitis condensans ilii
 Panosteitis, a long bone condition in large breed dogs
 In horses, pedal osteitis is frequently confused with laminitis.

See also
 Osteochondritis
 SAPHO syndrome

References

External links 

 
Inflammations
Osteopathies